KVDF may refer to:

 KVDF-CD, a low-power television station (channel 31) licensed to San Antonio, Texas, United States
 Tampa Executive Airport (ICAO code KVDF)